Aristotelia frankeniae is a moth of the family Gelechiidae. It is found in Spain and on Corsica.

The wingspan is 8–9 mm. The forewings are bright orange-ochreous, with a coppery-brown triangle reaching to one-third of the costa. The hindwings are somewhat shining pale grey. Adults have been recorded on wing from mid May to the end of June.

The larvae have been recorded feeding on the shoots of Frankenia pulverulenta. They feed from within a web.

References

Moths described in 1898
Aristotelia (moth)
Moths of Europe